The Dahlia Stakes is an American Thoroughbred horse race held annually in April at Laurel Park Racecourse in Laurel, Maryland. It is open to fillies and mares three-year-olds and up and is raced on turf. It is contested over a distance of 1 mile (8 furlongs).

The race was named in honor of international race queen Dahlia. She was one of the preeminent turf runners in the world during the mid-1970s and retired in 1976 after her six-year-old season as the world's leading money winning distaffer (female). In 48 starts made in France, Ireland, England, Canada, Italy and the U.S., Dahlia won 15 times, was second three times and third seven more times. That elevated her career earnings up to $1,543,139. She was voted England's racehorse of the year twice and was named champion grass horse in the U.S. (a category that included the males at that time) in 1974.

During her three-year-old campaign, Dahlia was shipped from her base in France to race in the world's most prestigious turf race at that time, the Washington, D.C. International Stakes a grade one at Laurel Park Racecourse. In that race, she galloped away to a three and a quarter length victory over Big Spruce.

Records

Speed record: 
 1 mile - 1:34.00 - Sweet Talker  (2006)

Most wins by a jockey:
 2 - Jeremy Rose     (2008 & 2009)

Most wins by a trainer:
 2 - H. Graham Motion    (2006 & 2008)
 2 - Barclay Tagg    (1985 & 1987)

Winners

See also 
 Dahlia Stakes top three finishers
 Laurel Park Racecourse

References

 The Dahlia Stakes at Pedigree Query

Laurel Park Racecourse
Horse races in Maryland
Recurring sporting events established in 1985
1985 establishments in Maryland